Glabbeek is a municipality located in the Belgian province of Flemish Brabant. The municipality comprises the towns of Attenrode, Bunsbeek, Glabbeek proper, Kapellen, Wever and Zuurbemde. On January 1, 2006, Glabbeek had a total population of 5,189. The total area is 26.78 km² which gives a population density of 194 inhabitants per km².

References

External links
 
Official website - Available only in Dutch

Municipalities of Flemish Brabant